Astrid Fischel Volio (born March 26, 1954) is a Costa Rican historian and politician.

Life
Astrid Fischel Volio was educated at the University of Costa Rica and the University of Southampton. From 1984 to 1998 she was Professor at the History and Geography School of the University of Costa Rica. 

From 1998 to 2002 she was First Vice President and Minister of Culture. She was appointed Minister of Education in 2002, but was forced to resign on 3 June 2003, amid a teachers' strike over the Ministry's inability to pay teachers.

Works
 Consenso y represión: Una interpretación sociopolítica de la educación costarricense [Consensus and Repression: A Socio-Political Interpretation of Costa Rican Education], 1987
 El Uso Ingenioso de la Ideología en Costa Rica [The Clever Use of Ideology in Costa Rica], 1992

References

External links
 Astrid FIschel Volio

1954 births
Living people
Vice presidents of Costa Rica
Government ministers of Costa Rica
Costa Rican historians
Women vice presidents
20th-century Costa Rican writers
21st-century Costa Rican writers